Adolfo Navajas Artaza (26 May 1925 – 2 August 2022) was an Argentine businessman and politician. An independent, he served as Governor of Corrientes Province from 1969 to 1973 and was Minister of Social Action from 1982 to 1983.

Navajas died on 2 August 2022, at the age of 97.

References

1925 births
2022 deaths
20th-century Argentine politicians
Ministers of social welfare of Argentina
Governors of Corrientes Province
Independent politicians
People from Corrientes Province